Angela Renée White (born May 11, 1988), known professionally as Blac Chyna, is an American model and socialite. She originally rose to prominence in 2010 as the stunt double for Nicki Minaj in the music video for the song "Monster" by Kanye West. She gained wider media attention after being name-dropped in the song "Miss Me" by Drake the same year, leading to a number of magazine appearances, including pieces in Dimepiece, Straight Stuntin and Black Men's Magazine. In 2014, she launched her own makeup brand, "Lashed by Blac Chyna", and a beauty salon in Encino, Los Angeles. She has since made a number of media appearances, including in her own reality television shows, Rob & Chyna and The Real Blac Chyna.

Career
While stripping at King of Diamonds, a popular Miami club, Chyna's unusual and "exotic" look made her popular; radio host Angela Yee described her as looking "like someone who was going to be famous." In 2010, Drake name-dropped her in "Miss Me". Her rising popularity led to modeling jobs on the covers of Dimepiece, Straight Stuntin and Black Men's Magazine. Later that year, she was cast as Nicki Minaj's stunt double in the song "Monster" by Kanye West.

Throughout her career, Chyna has undergone several surgeries for buttock augmentation and breast enhancement, but has also had surgery to reduce the size of her chest.

In February 2013, she enrolled in JLS Professional Make Up Artist School. In December 2013, she launched her online boutique, "88fin", filled with new clothing and products from her clothing line of the same name. Also that month, she launched her own brand of adhesive eyelashes, "Lashed by Blac Chyna". In February 2014, she purchased a beauty bar in Encino, Los Angeles, which offers makeup courses.

Since 2016, she has appeared in a number of reality television shows, including E!'s Keeping Up with the Kardashians, and her own reality show with then-boyfriend Rob Kardashian, Rob & Chyna, also on the E! network. In 2019, she starred in The Real Blac Chyna on Zeus Network. She has also appeared in Tokyo Toni's Finding Love ASAP!, and VH1's Love & Hip Hop: Hollywood.

Blac Chyna produces pornographic content on OnlyFans, which she joined in April 2020.

Personal life
In December 2011, Chyna appeared in the music video for the song "Rack City" by rapper Tyga; she has said that Tyga asked her to join him on tour that year, but she refused. They began dating in December 2011, and had a son together in October 2012. They split in 2014 when Tyga began a relationship with Kylie Jenner, leading to a number of social media feuds between Chyna and Jenner that ended when Chyna started dating Jenner's half-brother, Rob Kardashian, in 2016. In November 2016 she gave birth to their daughter.

In December 2016, Kardashian announced on his Instagram post that he and Chyna had split. They reconciled a few days later, but separated again in February 2017. In July 2017, Kardashian posted sexually explicit photos of Chyna on social media, leading to Chyna's obtaining a temporary restraining order against him. In October 2017, Chyna filed a more than $100 million dollar lawsuit against the Kardashian family for defamation. The trial began in April 2022. On May 2, 2022, a jury found in favor of the Kardashian family, with no damages being awarded to Chyna.

Discography

Filmography

Music videos
 "Monster" by Kanye West, Jay-Z, Rick Ross, Nicki Minaj and Bon Iver
 "Come on a Cone" by Nicki Minaj
 "Rack City" (Version 1 & 2) by Tyga
 "Rake It Up" by Yo Gotti and Mike WiLL Made-It featuring Nicki Minaj
 "Tutu" by 6ix9ine
 "Body" by Megan Thee Stallion
 "Seen Her" (Official music video released in 2020)

See also 

 Southern hip hop

References

External links

 
 
 
 Blac Chyna at the SKAM Artist website

1988 births
Living people
21st-century American businesswomen
21st-century American businesspeople
African-American female models
American cosmetics businesspeople
American make-up artists
Hip hop models
Kardashian family
Female models from Maryland
Female models from Washington, D.C.
American female erotic dancers
Johnson & Wales University alumni
Rappers from Washington, D.C.